HSwMS Södermanland (Söd) is a Swedish naval submarine, launched in 1988 and currently in active service.

Development 

Submarines of the Västergötland class had greater submarine hunting capacity than previous classes, partly due to the fact that they were equipped with a new modern submarine  torpedo. The submarines in the Västergötland class were able to fire up to six heavy and six light wire-guided torpedoes at the same time against different targets.

After significant upgrades, these two submarines were reclassified to a new .

Career 

At the same time, the submarines would be modified to handle international missions with operations in hot and salty waters. The conversion of the two submarines became so extensive that Kockums decided to reclassify the submarines to a new Södermanland class.

During 2022, Södermanland will undergo yet another life extension program, in order to be operational until 2028.

As Östergötland was dicomissioned in 2021, Södermanland is the only remaining submarine in its class.

References 

Västergötland-class submarines
Ships built in Malmö
1988 ships
Archer-class submarines
Republic of Singapore Navy